Events from the year 1792 in the Dutch Republic

Events

 - Dutch West India Company

Births

Deaths

1792 in the Dutch Republic
1790s in the Dutch Republic
Years of the 18th century in the Dutch Republic